Polska Wieś  is a village in the administrative district of Gmina Pobiedziska, within Poznań County, Greater Poland Voivodeship, in west-central Poland.

Notable residents
 Günter Schwartzkopff (1898–1940), Luftwaffe general

References

Villages in Poznań County